Samuli Peltonen (born 1981) is a Finnish cellist.

Education

Samuli Peltonen started his cello studies with his father Jussi Peltonen in Seinäjoki. He continued with Timo Hanhinen in Turku (1998–2002) and with Arto Noras in Sibelius Academy, Helsinki.

Work

As a chamber musician he has a highly successful international career. Currently he plays Principal cello at the Finnish National Opera, and is frequently invited to play as guest principal at the Copenhagen Opera and Opera Australia.

He has made radio recordings for Finnish Broadcasting Company YLE. A Recording of Cheremissian Fantasy for cello and orchestra with Helsinki Philharmonic Orchestra (Ondine) was released in 2010.

Samuli recorded for Yarling records company with his Sibelius Piano trio in 2016.

Competition success

 Turku National Cello Competition, 2006  – I prize
 Paolo International Cello Competition, 2007 – IV prize
 International Krzystof Penderecki Cello Competition, 2008 – I prize

References 

1981 births
Living people
People from Seinäjoki
Sibelius Academy alumni
Finnish cellists